Legislative elections were held in Åland on 6 October 1963.

Results

References

Elections in Åland
Aland
1963 in Finland